Union Township is an inactive township in Clark County, in the U.S. state of Missouri.

Union Township was established in 1868, taking its name from Union, Clark County, Missouri.

References

Townships in Missouri
Townships in Clark County, Missouri